Pabitra Kar (born 17 June 1949) is an Indian politician. He was the 11th deputy Speaker of the Tripura Legislative Assembly, in office since 18 March 2013. In a political career spanning five decades, Kar was a senior leader of the Communist Party of India (Marxist) and occupied several portfolios in the Government of Tripura. Prior to his election as Deputy Speaker, Kar was Industry Minister of Tripura from 1998 to 2004. He was Chairman (2008–2013) of the Tripura Industrial Development Corporation. He describes himself as a politician, social worker and farmer.

Early life and career 
Kar was born in a Bengali family. His father was Promode Chandra Kar and mother Rajlaxmi Kar. He attended the MBB College in Agartala, then affiliated to University of Calcutta and earned a BSc in Pure Science with distinction in the year 1971. Kar is married to Rama Das and the two have a daughter who is a qualified engineer. In 2013, he won election by just 1000 votes. The next time it was expected that he would face tough competition there.  the current deputy is Shri Biswa Bandhu Sen, since 21 June 2018. He was member of Tripura Legislative Assembly from Khayerpur (Tripura Vidhan Sabha constituency) since 1993 till 2018. In 2018 Tripura Legislative Assembly election he was defeated by Bharatiya Janata Party candidate Ratan Chakrabarty.

See also
 Manik Sarkar
 Manik Dey
 Badal Chowdhury

References

External links 
 Link to current deputy in office (Shows he was replaced)
 http://www.business-standard.com/article/news-ians/northeast-india-s-second-readymade-apparel-unit-opens-in-tripura-116040800680_1.html
 http://www.india.com/news/india/northeastern-states-assembly-speakers-to-meet-in-tripura-1224071/

1949 births
Living people
Communist Party of India (Marxist) politicians from Tripura
University of Calcutta alumni
People from Tripura
Tripura politicians
Tripura MLAs 1993–1998
Tripura MLAs 1998–2003
Tripura MLAs 2003–2008
Tripura MLAs 2008–2013
Tripura MLAs 2013–2018